Donald Spencer may refer to:

 Donald C. Spencer (1912–2001), American mathematician
 Donald Andrew Spencer Sr. (1915–2010), African American realtor in Cincinnati
 Don Spencer (born 1941), Australian children's television presenter and musician